The Mongol invasion of Byzantine Thrace took place in the winter of AH 662 (AD 1263/1264). The Seljuk Sultan of Rûm Kayqubad II appealed to Berke, khan of the Golden Horde, to attack the Byzantine Empire in order to free his brother Kaykaus II.

Background
These events are rather well-reported from various perspectives. Among the Egyptian sources are Baybars, Badr al-Din al-Ayni, al-Dhahabi, al-Nuwayri and al-Maqrizi; among the Persian Ibn Bibi and al-Aqsarayi; among the Byzantine George Akropolites, George Pachymeres and Nicephorus Gregoras; and among the Turkish the Selçukname.

According to Ibn Bibi and al-Aqsarayi, Kaykaus plotted to overthrow the Emperor Michael VIII, but his plans were revealed by his maternal uncle, Kyr Kedid. The emperor had his equerry blinded, his general executed and his family imprisoned. Kaykaus then turned to the Golden Horde. According to al-Aqsarayi, one of his paternal aunts was a wife of Berke. According to Pachymeres, he had an uncle of high rank in the Horde. Whatever his connection, he made contact with the Horde, who enlisted the support of their vassal, Bulgaria.

Nicephorus Gregoras is unique in claiming that Kaykaus first made contact with the Bulgarian tsar, Konstantin Tikh, who enlisted his Mongol overlords. He admits, however, that the Mongol element was predominant in the invading army. He says that they came from Paristrion, that is, just north of the lower Danube. He gives their number as two thousand (or two tumens). According to Pachymeres, they were an autonomous band, de facto independent of the authority of the Golden Horde. If he is correct, then they were probably not under the leadership of Nogai Khan and were acting as mercenaries (to be paid in booty) of the Bulgars.

Invasion
The Mongols crossed the frozen Danube river in the winter of 1263/1264. They defeated the armies of Michael VIII in the spring of 1264. While most of the defeated army fled, the Byzantine Emperor escaped with the assistance of Italian merchants. After that Thrace was plundered.

Michael VIII was forced to release Kaykaus, and signed a treaty with Berke, in which he agreed to give one of his daughters, Euphrosyne Palaiogina, in marriage to Nogai. Berke ceded Crimea to Kaykaus as appanage and agreed that he would marry a Mongol woman. Michael also sent tribute to the Horde.

Berke's invasion of Thrace may have been the war which delayed Niccolò and Maffeo Polo's journey in the 1260s.

Notes

Sources

 
 

Thrace
Thrace
1265 in the Mongol Empire